"One Day Like This" is the second single from English band Elbow's fourth studio album, The Seldom Seen Kid, released on 2 June 2008 on two 7-inch vinyl records and one CD single.

On 21 May 2009, the song won the Ivor Novello Award for Best Song Musically and Lyrically. In October 2011, NME placed it at number 41 on its list of "150 Best Tracks of the Past 15 Years". After featuring in the 2012 Summer Olympics Closing Ceremony, the single peaked at No. 4 in the United Kingdom—a new high for the song and for the band.

Background
The chorus line lyric "one day like this a year would see me right" had been in singer Guy Garvey's diary for several years before the song was written. Speaking in 2014 about the song, Garvey said, "We put the chords behind it and realised it was going to be the hook of all hooks. I was like, 'what do we think?'... It was, 'it's kind of similar to "Hey Jude", isn't it?' I was like, 'yeah, and it's also similar to "Loaded" by Primal Scream, and we like both those songs, don't we?' So isn't it just generous to do that, isn't it a satisfying thing for the listener?... And my God, how it changed our fortunes."

Chart performance
"One Day Like This" debuted at No. 39 in the UK Singles Chart on 8 June 2008, marking Elbow's seventh UK top-40 single. After 14 weeks, the single finally peaked at No. 35 on 14 September 2008. Due to the band's increasing popularity in the UK after winning their 2009 BRIT Award for Best British band, "One Day Like This" spent more weeks in the UK top 75 than any of Elbow's other singles with 31 weeks in five runs by the end of 2014, peaking at No. 4 in August 2012 following their appearance at the closing ceremony of the London Olympics. In February 2021, it was certified double Platinum in the UK by the BPI. It also charted in the Flanders region of Belgium in July 2009, when it peaked at No. 19 on the region's Ultratop chart.

Music video
The promotional video for the song was directed by Rigan Ledwidge. It features a man (David Lemke, an employee at the time of guerilla marketing franchise AArrow Advertising) at a busy road junction, holding a red sign in the shape of a pointing arrow, containing the words "Condos - Now Selling".  As he stands at the junction, he turns the sign around many times, pointing it in all directions, including flipping it in the air and spinning it on his head, whilst the motorists, pedestrians and skateboarders pass by.

Track listings
CD single

7-inch vinyl 1

7-inch vinyl 2

Credits
Producer – Craig Potter, Elbow
Words By – Guy Garvey 
Written By – Elbow

Charts

Certifications

Cover versions
Snow Patrol covered "One Day Like This" on Jo Whiley's "Live Lounge on Tour", and was released as a limited edition b-side of "Crack the Shutters". An excerpt from the song is included in "The Official BBC Children in Need Medley", a charity single performed by Peter Kay's Animated All Star Band, released on 21 November 2009. The excerpt segues from "Hey Jude"—a similarity pointed out by Garvey.

Sarah Brightman version

"One Day Like This" was the second single from Sarah Brightman's eleventh studio album, Dreamchaser, released on 15 April (16 January in Japan), 2013, and produced by Mike Hedges and Sally Herbert.

Track listing

Music video
This music video starts with Sarah in her purple kimono setting her own tea for breakfast. She then dresses herself up in black and gold and has her hair tied in an updo and she puts on her space helmet for the rest.

References

2008 singles
2008 songs
2012 singles
Elbow (band) songs
Fiction Records singles
Sarah Brightman songs
Songs written by Guy Garvey